Dan Conlin is a maritime historian and museum curator in Halifax, Nova Scotia. 
 
Born in Berwick, Nova Scotia, he received a Bachelor of Journalism degree with a concentration in History  from Carleton University in Ottawa, Ontario  in 1986.  Conlin worked at the Canadian Broadcasting Corporation, mainly in Radio with CBC Ottawa but also at CBC Television in Halifax and As It Happens in Toronto. He also did two volunteer postings overseas as a teacher in Swaziland in 1989 and an archaeological field worker in Namibia in 1993. He returned home to Nova Scotia in 1994 and earned a master's degree in history at Saint Mary's University in Halifax in 1996 with a thesis entitled "A Private War in the Caribbean Nova Scotia Privateering, 1793-1805".  Conlin became Curator of Marine History at the Maritime Museum of the Atlantic in 1997. He curated and wrote the Museum's permanent Titanic exhibit and temporary exhibits such as St. Louis: Ship of Fate. Conlin also teaches in the Atlantic Canada Studies department at Saint Mary's University. He is a contributor to the  Oxford Companion to Canadian History and is most recently author of the book Pirates of the Atlantic: Robbery, murder and mayhem off the Canadian East Coast . In 2013 he became the curator at the Canadian Museum of Immigration at Pier 21 in Halifax and in 2014 published his second book War Through the Lens: The Canadian Army Film and Photo Unit 1941-1945, an illustrated history of the Canadian Army Film and Photo Unit, based on oral history interviews he conducted at the journalism department of Carleton University.

References
Dorothy Grant, "Curator Exhibits Adventurous Spirit",   ‘ ‘Halifax Sunday Herald’ ’ June 24, 2001, p. B8

External links
 ‘ ‘SMARTS’ ’, Saint Mary’s University Arts, 2005, p. 5
 “Profile of Dan Conlin”, Chebucto Community Net

21st-century Canadian historians
Canadian military historians
Canadian curators
Canadian maritime historians
Canadian male non-fiction writers
Living people
Historians of Atlantic Canada
People from Kings County, Nova Scotia
Writers from Halifax, Nova Scotia
Year of birth missing (living people)